The Old American Barn Dance is an American country music television series carried by the DuMont Television Network from July 5 to September 13, 1953.

Production
The summer replacement program, hosted by Bill Bailey, aired on Sunday nights from 10:30–11 p.m. Eastern Time. The series was filmed at Kling Studios, 639 N. Fairbank Court at Ohio Street, in Chicago, Illinois.

Performers included Tennessee Ernie Ford, Pee Wee King, the Candy Mountain Girls, the Chordmen, Merle Travis, Kenny Roberts, Johnny Bond, Homer and Jethro, Patsy Montana and the Kentucky Thoroughbreds.

In 1959, episodes were edited together with segments from Eddy Arnold Time and Jimmy Dean's Town and Country Time (a local Washington, D.C. program) and syndicated by producer Bernard L. Schubert under the title, Your Musical Jamboree.

Episode status
Three episodes are held in the J. Fred MacDonald collection at the Library of Congress.

See also
List of programs broadcast by the DuMont Television Network
List of surviving DuMont Television Network broadcasts

References

Bibliography
David Weinstein, The Forgotten Network: DuMont and the Birth of American Television (Philadelphia: Temple University Press, 2004) 
Alex McNeil, Total Television, Fourth edition (New York: Penguin Books, 1980) 
Tim Brooks and Earle Marsh, The Complete Directory to Prime Time Network TV Shows, Third edition (New York: Ballantine Books, 1964)

External links
 The Old American Barn Dance at the Internet Archive
 The Old American Barn Dance at YouTube
 
 DuMont historical website

1953 American television series debuts
1953 American television series endings
1950s American variety television series
American country music
Black-and-white American television shows
Country music television series
DuMont Television Network original programming
English-language television shows